Sisowath Youtevong (1913 – 17 July 1947) was a Cambodian prince, politician and mathematician, credited as the "Father of Cambodian Democracy", and a member of the Democratic Party. He served as the fourth Prime Minister of Cambodia from December 1946 to July 1947. He was the first to be elected prime minister.

Biography 
Sisowath Youtevong was born in 1913 in Udong, Cambodia, as the son of Prince Chamraengvongs (1870–1916) and Princess Sisowath Yubhiphan (1877–1967). He studied at a science university in France and received a certificate of mathematics in 1941. He was also a member of the French Section of the Workers' International, the predecessor to the present-day Socialist Party. He would later go on to be elected as President of the newly founded Democratic Party of Cambodia in April 1946. Youtevong was the principal author of the constitution at that time, which was put to use on 6 May 1947. He led the Democratic Party to victory in the elections on 1 September 1946 and was sworn in as Prime Minister on 15 December 1946. Prince Sisowath Youtevong died on 17 July 1947, at Calmette Hospital, Phnom Penh, and was succeeded by Sisowath Watchayavong.

Personal life 
Sisowath Youtevong was married to a French woman named Dominique Laverne and had two daughters: Sisowath
Kantara (born 1945) and Sisowath Lenanda (born 1946).

References 

 

 

1913 births
1947 deaths
20th-century Cambodian politicians 
Cambodian princes 
Cambodian socialists 
Prime Ministers of Cambodia
People from Kampong Speu province 
Democratic Party (Cambodia) politicians
House of Sisowath
Cambodian politicians
University of Montpellier alumni